Rosetta Douglass-Sprague (June 24, 1839 – November 25, 1906) was an American teacher and activist. She was a founding member of the National Association for Colored Women. Her mother was Anna Murray Douglass and her father was Frederick Douglass.

Early years
Rosetta was born to Anna Murray-Douglass and Frederick Douglass in 1839, in New Bedford, Massachusetts. She was the eldest of five children.

When she was five, she moved with her parents to Lynn, Massachusetts. When she was six, she stayed with Abigail and Lydia Mott, from Albany, New York. Abigail taught her to read and write, and Lydia taught her to sew. At the age of 11, she assisted her father in making and packaging his newspaper. On December 24, 1863, she married Nathan Sprague. 

In 1845, the Rochester Board of Education closed public schools to black students. Frederick Douglass sent Rosetta to a private school rather than send her to an all-black school that Rochester set up for black students. She eventually was tutored between the ages of two and seven. In 1848, Rosetta was admitted into the Seward Seminary in Rochester, New York. Rosetta was segregated from the white students while she was there, and her father spoke out against this in his newspaper. She was expelled after a vote of her white classmates with only one vote against her, proposed by the white, and abolitionist, director. She also attended Oberlin College’s Young Ladies Preparatory and Massachusetts' Salem Normal School.

Rosetta was a critical thinker like her father, but struggled against the demands of gender roles during her time. She did not support her father's interracial marriage after her mother's death. 

Her husband had been enslaved and was poorly educated. He struggled to find his footing and a job. She had seven children (including Fredericka Douglass Sprague Perry), and many grandchildren.

Teaching, writing, and activism
Douglass worked as a teacher. She eventually became primarily a homemaker and wife. She wrote the paper My Mother as I Recall Her in 1900, as well as the paper What Role is the Educated Negro Woman to Play in the Uplifting of Her Race? 

She wrote “The galling chain and merciless lash were the instruments used to accomplish humiliation and degradation of the African. Avarice was the factor in the composition of the character of a large number of white men of America that wrought such ravishes in the well-being of the African.” She also wrote, “Allow the Negro two hundred and fifty years of unselfish contact to offset the two hundred and fifty years of Caucasian selfishness, and be as assiduous in his regeneration as you were in his degradation - then judge him.”

Douglass worked with her father, and had a keen sense of social justice issues. She advised her father against accepting the presidency of the Freedman’s Bank. She went on to become a founding member of the National Association for Colored Women.

References

External links
 "My Mother As I Recall Her, by Rosetta Douglass Sprague". Library of Congress
 . Mount Hope Cemetery, Washington, DC. Includes links to headstones for her husband and children.

1839 births
1906 deaths
African-American educators
American educators
People from New Bedford, Massachusetts
Rosetta Douglass